Hallock Township may refer to the following townships in the United States:

 Hallock Township, Kittson County, Minnesota
 Hallock Township, Peoria County, Illinois